WIOU is an American drama television series, which aired on CBS from October 24, 1990 until March 20, 1991. The show is set in the news department of a fictional television station whose actual callsign is WNDY, but which is nicknamed WIOU by its staff because of the station's perennial financial struggles.

According to television researchers Tim Brooks and Earle Marsh, 14 episodes were produced but only 13 aired.

Summary
The show stars John Shea as news director Hank Zaret. The cast also includes Mariette Hartley as executive producer Liz McVay; Harris Yulin and Helen Shaver, as news anchors Neal Frazier and Kelby Robinson; Phil Morris, as aggressive reporter Eddie Bock; Jayne Brook, as reporter Ann Hudson; Kate McNeil, as reporter Taylor Young; Dick Van Patten, as aging weatherman Floyd Graham; and Wallace Langham, as news intern Willis Teitelbaum.

Cast

John Shea as Hank Zaret
Helen Shaver as Kelby Robinson
Harris Yulin as Neal Frazier
Dick Van Patten as Floyd Graham
Mariette Hartley as Liz McVay
Kate McNeil as Taylor Young
Phil Morris as Eddie Brock 
Wallace Langham as Willis Teitelbaum 
Jayne Brook as Ann Hudson
Joe Grifasi as Tony Pro 
Robin Gammell as Kevin Doherty

Episodes

References

External links
 
 

1990s American drama television series
1990 American television series debuts
1991 American television series endings
CBS original programming
English-language television shows
Fictional television stations
Television series about journalism
Television series about television
Television series by MGM Television
Television series created by John Eisendrath
Television shows set in New York City